Zygrfryd Ludwik Szołtysik (born October 24, 1942, in the village Sucha Góra near what is present Radzionków) is a Polish former football (midfielder) playing most of his career in Górnik Zabrze. He carried the nickname 'Zyga' or 'Mały' (contributed by a small posture, 162 cm of height and 60 kg).

Szołtysik emerged as football player in a Polish club Zryw Chorzów notorious, at that time, for an excellent work with young players. He was soon visited by representatives of Górnik Zabrze and contracted to the club, in 1962. Having spent 16 years in Zabrze, the time interrupted merely for a season in Valenciennes FC, he accounted for 395 matches in Polish league, which makes him the club leader of that classification. The total number of games for Górnik's colors exceeds 500 matches. He was a member of a team which claimed seven titles in the Polish Ekstraklasa (1963–1967, 1971, 1972), six victories in the Polish Cup, and the only European final ever achieved by a Polish football club (1970). He boasts of 124 goals for Górnik Zabrze including 91 in the league.

He made his debut to the national team in 1963 in the play against Norway (along with Włodzimierz Lubański), won 9–0, which had proved to be the highest victory of Poland for almost half century. He belongs to the very narrow group that scored two goals in the first match for Poland. Two years before he had won second place in the European Youth Championships.  But the greatest achievements were yet to come. The Polish football team qualified to Olympic Games in 1972. In a day following the tragic events of Munich massacre, Poland played a decisive match against Soviet Union. While the Soviet team was prevailing over Poland, the team coach, Kazimierz Górski decided upon bringing Szołtysik to the game. He quickly turned the tide into the favor of Poland, scoring the decisive goal that gave Poland victory 2:1. After defeating Hungary in the final, Poland (and Szołtysik as member of the team) secured the gold medal. He ended up international career the same year with the final standings of 46 games and 10 goals.

He was awarded the prize "Złote Buty" (Gold Shoes) by newspaper 'Sport' in 1969. He left Poland for Canada in 1978, he returned and played in Górnik Knurów for six years, and eventually moved to Germany where he ended football career in 1990.

External links
 

Living people
1942 births
Polish footballers
People from Tarnowskie Góry County
Poland international footballers
Górnik Zabrze players
Valenciennes FC players
Ekstraklasa players
Footballers at the 1972 Summer Olympics
Olympic gold medalists for Poland
Olympic footballers of Poland
Polish expatriate footballers
Expatriate footballers in France
Polish expatriate sportspeople in France
Expatriate footballers in Germany
Polish expatriate sportspeople in Germany
Expatriate soccer players in Canada
Polish expatriate sportspeople in Canada
Olympic medalists in football
Sportspeople from Silesian Voivodeship
Medalists at the 1972 Summer Olympics
Canadian National Soccer League players
Toronto Falcons players
Association football midfielders